The 2015 Birmingham Bowl was a college football bowl game played on January 3, 2015 at Legion Field in Birmingham, Alabama in the United States.  The ninth annual Birmingham Bowl saw the Florida Gators of the Southeastern Conference defeat the East Carolina Pirates of the American Athletic Conference by a score of 28–20. The game started at 11:00 a.m. CST and aired on ESPN. It was one of the 2014–15 bowl games that concluded the 2014 FBS football season.

Teams
This was the second overall meeting between these two teams. The last time these two teams met was in 1983, a game Florida won by a score of 24–17.  The teams would meet again on September 12, 2015 at Florida's Ben Hill Griffin Stadium, a game Florida won 31-24.

East Carolina Pirates

After finishing their regular season with an 8–4 record, the Pirates accepted their invitation to play in the game.

This was East Carolina's second Birmingham Bowl. They previously played in the 2006 PapaJohns.com Bowl (the inaugural version of that game), losing to the South Florida Bulls by a score of 24–7.

Florida Gators

After finishing their regular season with a 6–5 record, the Gators accepted their invitation to play in the game.

Florida was led by interim head coach D. J. Durkin. Durkin was the Gators defensive coordinator until former head coach Will Muschamp was released at the conclusion of the 2014 regular season. Muschamp's replacement is former Colorado State head coach Jim McElwain.

This was Florida's first Birmingham Bowl.

Game summary

Scoring summary

Source:

Statistics

References

Birmingham Bowl
Birmingham Bowl
East Carolina Pirates football bowl games
Florida Gators football bowl games
January 2015 sports events in the United States
Birmingham Bowl